Admiral Sir Ragnar Musgrave Colvin,  (7 May 1882 – 22 February 1954) was a long-serving Royal Navy officer who commanded the Royal Australian Navy (RAN) at the outbreak of the Second World War.

Early life and background
Colvin was the son of Clement Sneyd Colvin and his wife Alice Jane, née Lethbridge. This connected him with a long and illustrious line of British Empire soldiers and administrators, the Colvin family; his grandfather was John Russell Colvin, lieutenant-governor of the North-West Provinces of British India during the mutiny of 1857. His uncles included Walter Mytton and Auckland, also lieutenant-governor of the North-West Provinces and Oudh. A first cousin, Brenda Colvin (1897–1981), was an important landscape architect, author of standard works in the field and a force behind its professionalization. A more distant cousin was Sidney Colvin, who grew up to be a critic, curator, and great friend of Robert Louis Stevenson.

Naval career
Colvin joined the Royal Navy as a cadet in HMS Britannia in 1896. He was promoted to acting sub-lieutenant on 15 July 1901 and subsequently confirmed in that rank from the same date. The following year, he was in November 1902 posted to serve on HMS Foam, serving in the Mediterranean Fleet. He was commissioned lieutenant six years later and, after qualifying as a gunnery specialist in 1904, was promoted commander in 1913. In the First World War he served as Executive Officer in the cruiser , and in the battleship  in which he served in the Battle of Jutland in 1916. Promoted captain on 31 December 1917, he served in the Admiralty as Assistant Director of Plans and was appointed a Commander of the Order of the British Empire.

After the war Colvin commanded the cruiser  in the Black Sea and the Mediterranean and in 1922 to 1924 he was Naval Attaché in Tokyo. He re-joined  as Flag Captain to the Commander-in-Chief, Atlantic Fleet, and in 1927 became Director of the Naval Tactical School, Portsmouth. Colvin was promoted rear admiral in 1929 and soon was appointed Chief of Staff to the Commander-in-Chief, Atlantic Fleet. In 1932 he was appointed a Companion of the Order of the Bath and became Commander of the 2nd Battle Squadron. Promoted vice admiral in 1934, he became president of the Royal Naval College, Greenwich, and commander of the Royal Naval War College. He was appointed a Knight Commander of the Order of the Bath in 1937.

Colvin was appointed Chief of Naval Staff to the Royal Australian Navy in 1937. Under his leadership, the Royal Australian Navy expanded its naval fleet and maintained a high profile in Australia's military affairs.

At the outbreak of the Second World War, Colvin was an active participant in international planning; however, by 1940 his health was failing and he resigned the following year. Colvin returned to London where he served as Naval Advisor to the Australian High Commission from 1942 to 1944.

Family
In 1918 he married Sibyl Kays. They had two children: 
 John Horace Ragnar Colvin (18 June 1922 – 4 October 2003) HM Ambassador to Mongolia, 1971–1974, and spy with the Secret Intelligence Service (one child is Mark Colvin, an Australian journalist); and,
 Mrs. Prudence (Prue) Balfour (married in 1949 to Colin James Balfour, Commander, Royal Navy (1924 – 13 August 2009 aged 85), children Major General James Balfour CBE, b 1951, and Belinda.)

References 

|-

1882 births
1954 deaths
British naval attachés
Admiral presidents of the Royal Naval College, Greenwich
Ragnar
Companions of the Order of the Bath
Knights Commander of the Order of the British Empire
People educated at Stubbington House School
Royal Australian Navy admirals
Royal Navy admirals of World War II
Royal Navy personnel of World War I
Military personnel from London